In geometry, the hexagonal prism is a prism with hexagonal base. Prisms are polyhedrons; this polyhedron has 8 faces, 18 edges, and 12 vertices.

Since it has 8 faces, it is an octahedron. However, the term octahedron is primarily used to refer to the regular octahedron, which has eight triangular faces. Because of the ambiguity of the term octahedron and tilarity of the various eight-sided figures, the term is rarely used without clarification.

Before sharpening, many pencils take the shape of a long hexagonal prism.

As a semiregular (or uniform) polyhedron 

If faces are all regular, the hexagonal prism is a semiregular polyhedron, more generally, a uniform polyhedron, and the fourth in an infinite set of prisms formed by square sides and two regular polygon caps. It can be seen as a truncated hexagonal hosohedron, represented by Schläfli symbol t{2,6}. Alternately it can be seen as the Cartesian product of a regular hexagon and a line segment, and represented by the product {6}×{}. The dual of a hexagonal prism is a hexagonal bipyramid.

The symmetry group of a right hexagonal prism is D6h of order 24. The rotation group is D6 of order 12.

Volume

and its surface area can be
.

Symmetry 
The topology of a uniform hexagonal prism can have geometric variations of lower symmetry, including:

As part of spatial tesselations 

It exists as cells of four prismatic uniform convex honeycombs in 3 dimensions:

It also exists as cells of a number of four-dimensional uniform 4-polytopes, including:

Related polyhedra and tilings 

This polyhedron can be considered a member of a sequence of uniform patterns with vertex figure (4.6.2p) and Coxeter-Dynkin diagram .  For p < 6, the members of the sequence are omnitruncated polyhedra (zonohedrons), shown below as spherical tilings. For p > 6, they are tilings of the hyperbolic plane, starting with the truncated triheptagonal tiling.

See also

References

External links 
Uniform Honeycombs in 3-Space VRML models
The Uniform Polyhedra
Virtual Reality Polyhedra The Encyclopedia of Polyhedra Prisms and antiprisms
 
Hexagonal Prism Interactive Model -- works in your web browser

Prismatoid polyhedra
Space-filling polyhedra
Zonohedra